Walter David Dishell (born July 16, 1939) is an American physician who has served as a medical consultant on several long-running TV shows, including M*A*S*H, Medical Center, Trapper John, M.D., and Knots Landing. Dishell is an ear, nose and throat (ENT) specialist, head and neck surgeon, and facial cosmetic surgeon.

Early life
Dishell was born in Detroit, Michigan. He attended medical school at the University of Michigan.

Career
Dishell, who is subspecialized in facial cosmetic surgery, began using his medical background in entertainment when, soon after he completed his residency in plastic surgery at UCLA, CBS asked him to be a medical adviser for the show Medical Center in the 1960s.  Like many similar shows, Medical Center focused on physician-patient relationships instead of the actual medicine itself.  Dishell said that "the disease itself didn't matter... [CBS] would give me a dramatic story and then I would build the medicine around it.”

One challenge Dishell faced as a medical consultant for M*A*S*H was always making sure that the medicine Alan Alda and his fellow actors and actresses practiced was not too advanced. Dishell consulted medical textbooks from the 1950s and professional publications like the Journal of War Surgery to ensure the show’s historical accuracy. Dishell collaborated with Alda writing Life Time, the episode of the series that follows a patient needing an aortic graft in real time.

Dishell was also the medical reporter for NBC News from 1983 to 1985, and frequently appeared on ABC's A.M. Los Angeles as a medical consultant.  In 1986, he established the Aesthetic Surgery Associates of Encino, California.

References

External links 
 
 

American plastic surgeons
1939 births
Physicians from Detroit
American male screenwriters
University of California, Los Angeles alumni
Living people
Writers from Detroit
Screenwriters from Michigan
University of Michigan Medical School alumni